Nachi-Katsuura Observatory is an astronomical observatory in Nachikatsuura, Wakayama, Japan. Facing the Pacific Ocean, it lies within the Yoshino-Kumano National Park. It is 0.83368 Earth radi from the rotational axis of the Earth, and +0.55040 Earth radii above the equatorial plane. The IAU observatory code for Nachi-Katsuura is 905.

See also 
List of astronomical observatories

Notes

Astronomical observatories in Japan